Konstantinos M. Mitsopoulos (1844–1911) was an author, geologist, mineralogist, chemist, and professor.  His uncle Iraklis Mitsopoulos was the father of modern natural sciences in Greece.  He followed in his uncle's footsteps, and was the first student to receive a doctorate degree in the natural sciences at the University of Athens in 1868.  He was one of the first scientists in Greece to publicly promote Darwin's theory of evolution.  He edited and published the periodical known as Prometheus in 1890, promoting Darwinist views. The publication was shut down by the church two years later.

Mitsopoulos was born in Patras.  He followed the degree path of natural sciences at the University of Athens during the 1860s.  He continued his studies in Germany at the Freiberg University of Mining and Technology.  It was one of the leading universities in Europe for geology and mineralogy.  Some of his professors included Hieronymous Theodor Richter and Clemens Winkler.  He returned to Greece and became a professor at the University of Athens and Athens Polytechnic University.  He became dean of the School of Philosophy, president of the University of Athens and the Athens Polytechnic University.  He died in Athens in 1911 at the age of 67.  He was honored with the Silver Medal of the Order of the Redeemer.

Biography 
He was born in Patra in 1844.  His uncle was Hercules Anastasios Mitsopoulos.  He studied at the University of Athens some of his professors were Dimitrios Stroumpos, Vassilios Lakon, and Anastassios Christomanos.  His uncle was the president of the University of Athens at the time.  He was the first student to receive a doctorate degree in the natural sciences at the University of Athens in 1868. He graduated with honors and went to the prestigious German mining school Freiberg University from 1868 to 1874.  Some of his professors included Hieronymous Theodor Richter, Clemens Winkler, Gustav Zeuner, and Ferdinand Reich.  August Meyer was also attending the university at the time.  Konstantinos studied physics, chemistry, pyrochemistry, geology, geodesics, metallurgy, mining, mining law, and mechanical engineering for six years.  While he was a student Konstantinos and Armin Junge improved the blowing apparatus for blowpipe mining.  He returned to Greece in 1875.  He focused on geology and mineralogy.

In 1875, at age 31, he became professor of geology and mineralogy at the University of Athens.  Ten years later he also began to teach geology and mineralogy at the Athens Polytechnic University.  He stayed in this position from 1885 to 1910.  In the academic year 1888–1889, he was dean of the School of Philosophy which was part of the University of Athens.  He was involved with the academic senate from 1890 to 1900.  His uncle died in 1892.  His son Maximus Mitsopoulos was born five years later in 1897.  He followed in his father's footsteps.  He became a well-known geologist and mineralogist.  During this period the faculty of the School of Philosophy lobbied to separate the Physics and Mathematics department from the School of Philosophy.  Konstantinos signed the petition.  He became president of the University of Athens in the academic year 1900–1901.  He became the president of the Athens Polytechnic University in 1902.  He was 58 years old.  He remained in this position until 1910.  He also taught at the Industrial and Commercial Academy founded by Greek chemist Othon Roussopoulos.  It functioned from 1894 to 1923.  Konstantinos was a member of the Greek organizations Parnassos and Hellinismos.  He was also editor of the publication called Hellinismos.  He participated in a large number of international research projects along with Anastassios Christomanos and Timoleon Argyropoulos.  At his funeral, Anastasios Damvergis said he was an "unparalleled popularizer of scientific knowledge and teaching, making the findings common to all of science."

Literary Works

References

Bibliography

1844 births
1911 deaths
19th-century Greek educators
19th-century Greek scientists
Academic staff of the National and Kapodistrian University of Athens
Greek physicists
Greek geologists
Scientists from Patras
Writers from Patras